Sominex is the trademarked name for several over the counter sleep aids.

Two different formulations of Sominex are available, depending upon the market. Both formulations contain a significant dose of a first generation antihistamine with hypnotic properties.

In the United States, Sominex is marketed by Prestige Brands and has as its active ingredient diphenhydramine hydrochloride. Diphenhydramine hydrochloride is also marketed as a sleep aid in Canada under the same name.

In the UK, Actavis UK markets promethazine hydrochloride under the Sominex name. Actavis also markets a product by the name of Sominex Herbal, which is an herbal sleep aid with three natural active ingredients: hops, valerian, and passion flower extracts.

In India, the Sominex name is used by Lunar BioPharma Pvt. Ltd. to market a nutritional supplement intended to provide "long lasting relief from heart burn, acid peptic disorders and indigestion". This formulation of Sominex is not related to the two formulations (containing either diphenhydramine or promethazine) that are marketed as sleep aids by Prestige Brands and Actavis in the United States and the United Kingdom, respectively.

Diphenhydramine and promethazine are both marketed by names other than Sominex for several indications including and besides their use as sleep aids. For example, diphenhydramine is sold under the brand name Benadryl as an anti-histamine for use against allergies. Tylenol PM contains diphenhydramine in addition to acetaminophen for the purpose of inducing sleep and reducing pain and/or fever. Promethazine is marketed by the brand name Phenergan for use against allergy symptoms and motion sickness in the US, where a prescription for promethazine is required. It is also available in the form of a syrup either alone or in combination with one or more of several other active ingredients including codeine and dextromethorphan, for the treatment of allergy symptoms, cough, or cold, among other uses. In Canada, promethazine is available as an over the counter anti-histamine by the name of Histantil.

History

As early as the 1950s, Sominex was being promoted in television commercials. One ad spot featured  the image of the sleeping pill tablet itself as a classic bouncing ball to follow the lyrics of their jingle, shown on the lower third of the screen.

References

H1 receptor antagonists